The 2010 Tunbridge Wells Borough Council election took place on 6 May 2010 to elect members of Tunbridge Wells Borough Council in Kent, England. One third of the council was up for election and the Conservative Party stayed in overall control of the council.

After the election, the composition of the council was:
Conservative 42
Liberal Democrat 6

Election result
The results saw the Conservative stay in control of the council despite losing 2 seats. The Liberal Democrats gained seats in Benenden and Cranbrook wards to hold 6 seats, compared to 42 for the Conservatives. Overall turnout in the election was 68.59%.

Ward results

References

2010 English local elections
May 2010 events in the United Kingdom
2010
2010s in Kent